Fabricio Ferrari Barcelo (born 3 June 1985 in Santa Lucía, Uruguay) is a Uruguayan former professional cyclist, who rode professionally between 2010 and 2020, for ,  and the . He rode in the 2013 Vuelta a España, finishing in 121st place.

Major results

2005
 1st Stage 2 Vuelta Ciclista del Uruguay
 3rd  Time trial, Pan American Under-23 Road Championships
2008
 1st  Overall Vuelta al Goierri
1st Stage 1
2009
 1st Overall Bizkaiko Bira
2010
 4th GP Llodio
2011
 1st  Mountains classification Volta a Portugal
 5th Giro della Romagna
 10th Overall Tour of Qinghai Lake
2012
 7th Prueba Villafranca-Ordiziako Klasika
2016
 5th Overall Vuelta Ciclista Comunidad de Madrid
 9th Gran Premio Miguel Indurain
2017
 3rd Overall Vuelta a la Comunidad de Madrid
 7th Trofeo Matteotti
2020
 7th Overall Tour of Serbia

References

External links

1985 births
Living people
People from Santa Lucía, Uruguay
Uruguayan male cyclists